Reinhard Kopps (29 September 1914 in Hamburg – 11 September 2001 in Bariloche, Argentina) was an SS officer for the Nazi Party during World War II. Following the defeat of Germany in World War II, he helped Nazis escape to Argentina, finally fleeing there himself. Under the assumed name of Juan Maler, Kopps was hiding in the small town of Bariloche in the Andes Mountains. Bariloche was the home of some Germans after World War II.

Recently opened Nazi archives in 1994 caused ABC News to research Nazi war criminals. After research revealed a certain amount of Nazis living in Argentina, Sam Donaldson confronted Maler on camera, getting him to admit that he was Reinhard Kopps, a former Nazi, and that he assisted Nazis to leave Germany and settle in Argentina. In order to deflect attention away from himself, he told Donaldson that an even worse war criminal, Erich Priebke, was also living there, confirming ABC News' research. Priebke was soon arrested, and Kopps fled. The story was made for ABC's Primetime Live, as well as Nazi Hunters.

References

1914 births
2001 deaths
Military personnel from Hamburg
SS officers
German emigrants to Argentina